The Women's sprint event of the 2016 UCI Track Cycling World Championships was held on 5 and 6 March 2016. Zhong Tianshi of China won the gold medal.

Results

Qualifying
The qualifying was started at 10:00.

1/16 finals
The 1/16 finals were started at 11:06.

1/8 finals
The 1/8 finals were started at 12:14.

1/8 finals repechage
The 1/8 finals repechage was started at 12:24.

Quarterfinals
Race 1 was started at 10:00, Race 2 was started at 10:41.

Race for 5th–8th places
The race for 5th–8th places was held at 11:55.

Semifinals
Race 1 was held at 14:08 and Race 2 at 14:28.

Finals
Race 1 was held at 15:35 and Race 2 at 16:00.

References

Women's sprint
UCI Track Cycling World Championships – Women's sprint